RE:Brand was a British documentary and comedy television program that aimed to take a challenging look at cultural taboos.

It was conceived, written and hosted by Russell Brand, with the help of his comic partner for many projects, Matt Morgan. The series was shown on the now defunct digital satellite channel UK Play in 2002. As confirmed in his memoirs My Booky Wook and mentioned on his radio shows, Brand was often drunk or on heroin during the filming of RE:Brand.

Episode guide

External links

References

2002 British television series debuts
2002 British television series endings
2000s British comedy television series
2000s British documentary television series
British television documentaries
Play UK original programming
English-language television shows
Russell Brand